Arichel Hernández Mora (born 20 September 1993) is a Cuban professional footballer who plays as a midfielder for Liga Nacional club Mixco and the Cuba national team.

Club career
Hernández played for his provincial team Villa Clara and was allowed by the Cuban Football Federation to move abroad to join Panamanian side Independiente de la Chorrera in September 2017.

International career
Hernández participated in the 2014 Central American and Caribbean Games and the 2012 CONCACAF Men's Olympic Qualifying Tournament.

He made his senior debut on 22 February 2012 against Jamaica in an international friendly and has, as of January 2018, earned a total of 11 caps, scoring no goals. He represented his country in 2 FIFA World Cup qualification matches and played at the 2013 FIFA U-20 World Cup.

He was called up to the 2015 CONCACAF Gold Cup by Cuba but was unable to take part in the competition due to not being able to acquire a US visa. He and several others of the Cuban national under-23 football team had been in Antigua playing in the Caribbean section of the 2015 CONCACAF Men's Olympic Qualifying Championship qualification tournament and there had been administrative complications.

International goals
Scores and results list Cuba's goal tally first.

References

External links
 Arichel Hernández at Liga Dominicana de Fútbol
 
 

1993 births
Living people
Cuban footballers
People from Remedios, Cuba
Association football midfielders
FC Villa Clara players
C.A. Independiente de La Chorrera players
FC Pinar del Río players
Universidad O&M FC players
Liga Panameña de Fútbol players
Liga Dominicana de Fútbol players
Cuba youth international footballers
Cuba under-20 international footballers
Cuba international footballers
2015 CONCACAF Gold Cup players
2019 CONCACAF Gold Cup players
Cuban expatriate footballers
Expatriate footballers in Panama
Cuban expatriate sportspeople in Panama
Expatriate footballers in the Dominican Republic
Cuban expatriate sportspeople in the Dominican Republic